Evans Diamond at Stu Gordon Stadium is a college baseball park on the west coast of the United States, located on the campus of the University of California in Berkeley, California.

Opened  in 1933, it is the home field of the California Golden Bears of the Pac-12 Conference, with a seating capacity of 2,500. Evans Diamond is located in the UC sports complex at the southwest corner of campus, pressed between George C. Edwards Stadium to the west (right field) and Haas Pavilion to the east.

History

Originally named Edwards Field, it was renamed after Clint Evans, the California head coach from 1930–54.

The stadium was renovated in 1992 at a cost of $275,000, paid for by the donations of UC alumni, with  construction by RNT Landscaping of San Leandro.

On March 13, 2022, the stadium was named after Stu Gordon, a California baseball alumnus who helped found the Bear Backers program and led the cause for the baseball team's reinstatement in 2011.

The turf at Evans Diamond is natural grass, and the infield dirt is a combination of crushed cinder and the traditional clay.

In the right field corner are the batting cages and pitching machines, covered by a roof (but not enclosed); the bullpen is outside of the roof, closer to the warning track. In the left field corner is the other bullpen, without batting cages. Both bullpens are separated from the field of play by fences.

The Jackie Jensen press box lies directly behind home plate, above the last row of stands. Beyond the left field wall is Bancroft Way, the southern border of the UC campus. Beyond the right field wall is the concrete grandstand for the track stadium.

The baseball field has an unorthodox southwest alignment (home plate to center field), with the catcher, batter, and fans facing the mid-afternoon sun. (The optimal orientation of a baseball diamond is east-northeast.)

Future
Evans Diamond is in need of major renovations because the stadium is no longer considered up to the standards needed to host NCAA tournament games. This was a problem as recently as 2011, when the Golden Bears had to host their 2011 Super Regional vs. Dallas Baptist University at Stephen Schott Stadium in Santa Clara.

One of the Cal Baseball Foundation's primary goals is to see improvements at Evans Diamond, including the addition of field lights for night games. In the near future, the facility will also have to be able to host large television crews to accommodate the Pac-12 Network. Before California baseball's alumni game on October 21, 2012, it was announced that Evans Diamond will receive lights and a new video and scoreboard by the first conference games in 2013.  For the first time in the venue's history, Evans Diamond will be able to host night games during the 2013 season. While the actual stadium has in the past been considered inadequate by NCAA standards, the baseball program does have relatively new locker rooms and training facilities inside neighboring Haas Pavilion.

See also
 List of NCAA Division I baseball venues

References

External links

College baseball venues in the United States
California Golden Bears baseball
Sports venues in Berkeley, California
Baseball venues in California
1933 establishments in California
Sports venues completed in 1933